Colorado Proposition EE (also the Taxes on Nicotine Products Proposition) was a legislative referendum that appeared on ballots in Colorado in the November 2020 elections. It was a proposal to increase taxes on nicotine products and place a new tax on vaping products.

Proposal
Proposition EE originates from HB20-1427, a law that would increase taxes on cigarettes and nicotine products. As all tax increases have to be approved by voters under the Colorado Constitution, a Proposition was needed for the law to enter into effect.

The Proposition raises taxes on cigarettes and tobacco products, and levies a new tax on nicotine products. Under the proposal, these increases would be phased in between 2021 and 2027, resulting in a tax on cigarettes of $2.64 per pack (up from $0.84), a tax on other tobacco products of 62% of the price which they are sold to retailers at (up from 40%) and a new tax on nicotine products, also set at 62%. Additionally, the Proposition raised the minimum sale price of various nicotine products.

It is estimated that Proposition EE would generate up to $175.6m extra tax in its first budget year, rising to $275.9m by the time the new rates are fully in place. This would be used to increase funding for free preschool provision (an election pledge of Governor Jared Polis) as well as being used in rural schools, K-12 education, housing development, and general state spending.

Campaign

Support 
HB20-1427, the legislation which put Proposition EE on the ballot, was sponsored by Representatives Yadira Caraveo and Julie McCluskie and Senators Rhonda Fields and Dominick Moreno.

Endorsements

Opposition 
Opposition to Proposition EE mainly centered around opposition to increasing taxes in general but specifically because the Proposition was seen to be a sin tax. It was also noted by progressive groups who opposed the Proposition, such as the Working Families Party, that it would disproportionately affect poorer and working-class people, because they were more targeted by tobacco companies.

Endorsements

Neutral

Results

Ballot question 
The question put to voters was:

Results

See also

Cigarette taxes in the United States
List of Colorado ballot measures

References

Proposition EE
2020 Colorado ballot measures
Taxation in the United States
Smoking in the United States